Pantoja may refer to:

People with Pantoja as first or only surname
 Doña Ana de Pantoja, a fictional character in José Zorrilla's play Don Juan Tenorio
 Antonia Pantoja (1922–2002), Puerto Rican educator, social worker, feminist, civil rights leader and founder of the ASPIRA Association, a Hispanic non-profit organization
 Alexandre Pantoja, UFC Fighter
 Cristina Pantoja-Hidalgo (born 1944), award-winning Filipina author
 Diego de Pantoja (1571–1618), Spanish Jesuit and missionary to China who accompanied Matteo Ricci in Beijing
 Dr Dimas Pantoja, a fictional character portrayed by Jorge Enrique Abello in the 1996 production of La Viuda de Blanco
 Dominga Pantoja Nique (1889–2007), Peruvian supercentenarian who was aged 117 years 279 days at her death
 Super Crazy, nickname of Francisco Pantoja Rueda (born 1973), Mexican professional wrestler
 Isabel Pantoja (born 1956), contemporary Spanish singer
 Juan Pantoja de la Cruz (1553–1608), Spanish court painter
 Victor Pantoja, percussionist in the Latin jazz-rock-fusion group Azteca
Rudy Pantoja, an internet meme.

People with Pantoja as a Hispanic second surname
According to Spanish naming customs, a person's given name is followed by two family names (surnames). Traditionally, the first surname is the father's first surname, and the second is the mother's first surname, but this traditional order is reversible per current gender equality law.

 Alfonso Fernández Pantoja (died 1761), Roman Catholic Bishop of León, Spain (1753–1761)
 Dagoberto Lagos Pantoja, President of the Supreme Court of Chile (1929–1931)
 Marcos Rodríguez Pantoja, a feral child who lived with wolves for 10 years in the mountains of Northern Spain
 Oswaldo Alanis Pantoja (born 1989), Mexican football player

Places named Pantoja
 Cerro Pantoja, a stratovolcano on the border of Argentina and Chile
 Pantoja, Guanajuato, a village in the Mexican state of Guanajuato
 Pantoja, Peru, a town and garrison in Torres Causana District of the Maynas Province in Peru
 Pantoja, Spain, a municipality in the province of Toledo in the autonomous community of Castile-La Mancha, Spain
 Pantoja Islands, part of the Bligh Island Marine Provincial Park in British Columbia, Canada 
 Pantoja Park, a historic landmark located in the city of San Diego, California
 Pantoja neighbourhood in Santo Domingo, Dominican Republic.  The professional soccer team Atlético Pantoja is based here.

See also
 Antonio Pantojas (born 1948), a Puerto Rican actor, comedian, and dancer

Spanish-language surnames